Riverside-Albert is a Canadian community in Hopewell Parish of Albert County, New Brunswick. It was an incorporated village until the end of 2022.

Riverside-Albert is located on the Shepody River at the edge of the Shepody Marsh. The community of Harvey Parish is located across the river. It is approximately halfway between two major tourist destinations: Fundy National Park and the Hopewell Rocks.

A location place name.  Post office called Albert from 1875; Riverside from 1875 to 1932; Riverside from 1932.

The Trans Canada Trail passes through Riverside-Albert.

History

Riverside-Albert was incorporated as a village in 1966.

On 1 January 2023, Riverside-Albert amalgamated with the villages of Alma and Hillsborough and parts of five local service districts to form the new village of Fundy Albert. The community's name remains in official use.

Demographics 

Notable people

Notable residents have included Abner Reid McClelan and Roscoe Fillmore.

See also
List of communities in New Brunswick

References

External links
 Riverside-Albert website

Communities in Albert County, New Brunswick
Former villages in New Brunswick